Slijk-Ewijk is a village in the municipality of Overbetuwe in the province of Gelderland, the Netherlands.

It was first mentioned in 1573 as SlijckEwick. The etymology is unknown. The village developed into a linear settlement on artificial mounds. The tower of the Dutch Reformed Church probably dates from the 14th century. The church is mainly a 1912 construction. Huis Loenen is an estate which was constructed around 1825 on the location of a medieval castle. In 1840, it was home to 371 people.

Gallery

References 

Populated places in Gelderland
Overbetuwe